Derek Chadwick (born 21 March 1941) is an Australian former sportsman, playing both first-class cricket with Western Australia and Australian rules football for East Perth in the Western Australian Football League (WAFL).

Chadwick was a right-handed opening batsman who made 4082 runs at 34.30 during his cricketing career, with 9 centuries. He toured New Zealand with the Australian team in 1969-70. As a footballer he was a wingman and played a at-the-time club record 269 games for East Perth, winning their best and fairest award, the F.D. Book Medal twice. In 1964 he won a Simpson Medal for his performances with the Western Australian state team in tours of Melbourne and Adelaide, and was inducted into the WAFL Hall of Fame in 2004.

References

External links

1941 births
Living people
Australian cricketers
Western Australia cricketers
Cricketers from Western Australia
Australian rules footballers from Western Australia
East Perth Football Club players
West Australian Football Hall of Fame inductees
People from Busselton